The year 1908 in film involved some significant events.

Events
July 3 - Malhabour Theater, the first film house in Iloilo City was opened to the public.
July 14 – D. W. Griffith becomes a director at the American Mutoscope and Biograph Company in New York City. Between 1908 and 1913, Griffith will direct nearly 500 films starting with the release of The Adventures of Dollie.
October 28 – The Russian Film Industry begins with the release of Russia's first fictional narrative film Stenka Razin.
November 18 – Release in France of The Assassination of the Duke of Guise (La Mort du duc de Guise), the first film with a screenplay by an eminent man of letters, the playwright Henri Lavedan; it is also directed by two men of the theatre, Charles Le Bargy and André Calmettes, features actors of the Comédie-Française, and is accompanied by a score from Saint-Saëns.
December - Thomas Edison forms the Motion Picture Patents Company, with goals of controlling production and distribution, raising theater admission prices, cooperating with censorship bodies, and preventing film stock from getting into the hands of nonmember producers.
Pathé invents the newsreel that was shown in cinemas prior to a feature film.

Films released in 1908
The Adventures of Dollie, directed by D. W. Griffith
After Many Years
Antony and Cleopatra, directed by J. Stuart Blackton and Charles Kent
L'Arlésienne, directed by Albert Capellani
The Assassination of the Duke of Guise
 Beauty and the Beast (La Belle et la Bette) (French/ Pathe)
 Beauty of the Sleeping Woods, directed by Segundo de Chomon (French/ Pathe), based on the story of Sleeping Beauty by Charles Perrault
Betrayed by a Handprint, directed by D. W. Griffith
 The Bloodstone, produced by Siegmund Lubin
 The Castle Ghosts (Italian film)
 The Cat's Revenge (French)
 Cave of the Spooks, directed by Segundo de Chomon (French)
 A Christmas Carol (Essanay Film Co.)
 Cupid's Prank, directed by Edwin S. Porter
 The Devil, directed by D. W. Griffith for Thomas Edison Co., starring Harry Solter, Claire McDowell and Mack Sennett
 The Devil and the Gambler (Vitagraph)
Dr. Jekyll and Mr. Hyde, produced by William N. Selig, reissued as A Modern Dr. Jekyll; first film adaptation of the 1886 Robert Louis Stevenson novel
 Dr. Jekyll and Mr. Hyde, directed by Sidney Olcott for Kalem Films, starring Frank Oakes Rose, this was the 2nd ever film adaptation of the eponymous 1886 Robert Louis Stevenson novel
 The Doctor's Experiment (French)
The Dog And His Various Merits, produced by Pathé
 Don Juan Tenorio, directed by Ricardo de Banos and Alberto Marro (made in Spain)
 Dream of an Opium Fiend, directed by George Melies
Dreams of Toyland, directed by Arthur Melbourne-Cooper
A L'Ecu d'Or ou la bonne auberge, a French film regarded as one of the first pornographic films
Excursion To The Moon, directed by Segundo de Chomón
The Fairylogue and Radio-Plays
 The Fairy's Sword, directed by Lewin Fitzhamon (British)
 A Faithless Friend, directed by Lewin Fitzhamon (British)
Fantasmagorie, directed by Émile Cohl (first fully animated film)
 Fantoche's Nightmare (aka The Puppet's Nightmare), directed by Emile Cohl (French/ Gaumont)Fire In A Burlesque Theatre The Flower of Youth (French/ Pathe)From Show Girl To Burlesque Queen Fun with the Bridal Party, directed by George Melies 
 The Gambler and the Devil, directed by J. Stuart Blackton for Vitagraph
 The Hanging Lamp (French/ Pathe) starring Max Linder
 The Haunted Castle (French/ Pathe) The Haunted House, directed by Segundo de Chomón (French), aka The House of Ghosts Incident from Don Quixote, directed by George Melies (French)
 In the Bogie Man's Cave, directed by George Melies (French)In the Sultan's Power Legend of a Ghost (La légende du fantôme), directed by Segundo de Chomón – (France)
 The Legend of Sleepy Hollow, produced by Kalem Co., first ever film adaptation of the 1820 short story by Washington IrvingLong Distance Wireless Photography, directed by Georges Melies
 Lord Feathertop, directed by Edwin S. Porter, adapted from the story by Nathaniel HawthorneMacbeth, directed by J. Stuart BlacktonMagic Bricks, directed by Segundo de Chomón
 The Magic Mirror, directed by Ferdinand Zecca (French/ Pathe)
 The Man and His Bottle, directed by Lewin Fitzhamon (British)
 The Monkey ManMoscow Clad In Snow, produced by Pathé
 The New Lord of the Village, directed by George Melies
 The Nursemaid's Dream, directed by Lewin Fitzhamon, starring Gertie Potter (British)
 Oriental Black Art, directed by George Melies (French)Over The Hill To The Poorhouse Pharmaceutical Hallucinations, directed by George MeliesThe Physician Of The Castle A Poor Knight and the Duke's Daughter (French)
 Prehistoric Man, produced by Urban-Eclipse Prods.
 The Princess in the Vase, directed by Wallace McCutcheon, starring D.W. Griffith
 The Professor's Secret (French/ Gaumont)
 The Red Barn Crime, or Maria Marten, directed by William Haggar, starring Walter and Violet Haggar (British)The Reprieve: An Episode in the Life of Abraham LincolnRescued from an Eagle's Nest, directed by J. Searle Dawley, starring D. W. Griffith
 La Revolution en Russie, directed by Ferdinand ZeccaRomeo and Juliet, directed by J. Stuart Blackton
 The Runaway Horse (Le Cheval emballé), directed by Louis J. Gasnier – (France)
 The Saloon Keeper's Nightmare (French/ Gaumont)
 Satan Finds Mischief (French/ Pathe)
 She, directed by Edwin S. Porter for Thomas Edison Co., based on the H. Rider Haggard novel; starring Florence Auer and William V. Ranous
 Sherlock Holmes in the Great Murder Mystery, produced by Crescent Films (made in Denmark); incorporates scenes from Murders in the Rue Morgue by Poe
 The Snowman, directed by Wallace McCutcheon, starring Edward Dillon and Florence Auer
 The Spectre (aka The Specter)(French/ Pathe)
 The Spirit (French/ Gaumont)
 Spiritualistic Seance (French/ Pathe)
 Spooks Do The Moving (French/ Pathe)Stenka Razin (Russian) historical dramaThe Taming of the Shrew, directed by D. W. GriffithThe Tempest, directed by Percy StowThe Thieving Hand, directed by J. Stuart Blackton for Vitagraph, starring Paul PanzerTilly Bébé, die berühmte Löwenbändigerin (Tilly Bébé, the Famous Lion Tamer)
 Too Much Champagne (U.S./ Vitagraph); features scenes from Dante's Inferno 
 Toula's Dream (French/ Pathe)
 Trilby (Danish) directed by Viggo Larsen and A.R. Nielsen, starring Oda Alstrup and Viggo LarsenTrouble Of A Grass Widower, starring Max LinderTroubles Of A Manager Of A Burlesque Show The Tyrant Feudal Lord (French/ Gaumont) loosely based on Edgar Allan Poe's Masque of the Red DeathUn dame vraiment bien (Feuillade)A Visit To The Seaside, directed by George Albert Smith.  First natural color movie in cinema.
 The Wages of Sin: an Italian Tragedy (Vitagraph) an American film
 Wave of Spooks (French/ Pathe)
 Wedding Feast and Ghosts (made in Italy)Whaling Afloat And Ashore, directed by Robert W. Paul
 The Witch of Seville (made in Italy)
 The Witch's Donkey (French/ Pathe)
 The Wonderful Charm'', directed by George Melies (French)

Births

Deaths
 May 23 – Peter F. Dailey, actor, singer (born 1868)

Film debuts
 Hobart Bosworth – The Count of Monte Cristo (short)
 Sidney Drew – Cupid's Realm or A Game of Hearts (short)
 Julia Swayne Gordon – Othello (short)
 D.W. Griffith – actor/writer When Knighthood was in Flower (short); producer Deceived Slumming Party (short); director The Adventures of Dollie (short)
 Marion Leonard – At the Crossroads of Life (short)
 Owen Moore – The Guerilla (short)
 Miriam Nesbitt – Saved by Love
 Mack Sennett – Old Isaacs, the Pawnbroker (short)
 Earle Williams – Barbara Fritchie:  The Story of a Patriotic Woman (short)
 Kathlyn Williams – On Thanksgiving Day (short)

External links

References

 
Film by year